Excited may refer to:
 Excited (film), a 2009 Canadian romantic comedy-drama film  
 "Excited" (Little Birdy song) (2005)
 "Excited" (M People song) (1992)

See also
Excitation (disambiguation)
Excited state, an elevation in energy level above an arbitrary baseline energy state
Exciter (disambiguation)